Greatest & Latest is the fifth and final studio album by Dee Dee Ramone, released in 2000. It consists of re-recordings of Ramones songs, a re-recorded solo song ("Fix Yourself Up"), cover songs and an unreleased new song ("Sidewalk Surfin'").

The album was first available for sale online through the Los Angeles based independent record label Conspiracy Music. It was released in Japan in June 2000 and in Europe in August 2000.

Track listing

Personnel 

 Dee Dee Ramone – vocals, guitar
 Barbara Ramone – bass, vocals
 Chase Manhattan – drums
 Chris Spedding – guitar

Technical

 Chris Spedding – production, mixing
 Josh Achziger – engineering, mixing
 Kevin Bartley – mastering
 Louie Mandrapilias – graphics
 Jim Steinfeldt – photography

References

External links
 Greatest & Latest on Discogs.com. Retrieved on 6 December 2018.

2000 albums
Dee Dee Ramone albums